Houston Robert Ridge, Jr. (July 18, 1944 – October 17, 2015) was a professional American football defensive linemen who played four seasons for the San Diego Chargers of the American Football League. He achieved notoriety for filing a class-action lawsuit against the team in 1969 after suffering career-ending injuries that he claimed were caused by steroids and amphetamines issued to players. Ridge ultimately reached a $250,000 settlement with the Chargers.

References

1944 births
2015 deaths
People from Madera, California
Players of American football from California
American football defensive ends
American football defensive tackles
San Diego State Aztecs football players
San Diego Chargers players
American Football League players